Just What I Needed: The Cars Anthology is a two-disc, career-spanning compilation album of songs by the American new wave rock band the Cars. It features most of the band's singles, as well as many album tracks, non-album B-sides and unreleased songs.

Background
Whereas the 1985 Greatest Hits album contained the band's most popular hit singles, Just What I Needed includes an album's worth of rarities and unreleased tracks, in addition to deeper album tracks and the requisite hits.

This album contains the original album version of "I'm Not the One" from 1981, while the rendition on Greatest Hits was a 1985 remix. "Heartbeat City" is the only song on Greatest Hits that was excluded from this album.

Rare and unreleased tracks

B-sides
The following three songs are non-album single B-sides that were previously unreleased on CD:

"That's It" (B-side of 1979's "Let's Go") 
"Don't Go to Pieces" (B-side of 1980's "Don't Tell Me No" and 1981's "Gimme Some Slack") 
"Breakaway" (B-side of 1985's "Why Can't I Have You")

Demos

1977
The following four songs were recorded as demos in 1977. "Leave or Stay" and "Ta Ta Wayo Wayo" were eventually re-recorded for the band's 1987 album Door to Door; the other two tracks were never re-recorded.  All four songs were previously unreleased recordings.

"Take Me Now"
"Cool Fool"
"Ta Ta Wayo Wayo" (demo)
"Leave or Stay" (demo)

1978
The following previously unreleased song is an unfinished outtake from the band's first album, featuring only Ric Ocasek and Greg Hawkes. It was eventually re-recorded for 1979's Candy-O.
"Night Spots" (early version)

1979
The previously unreleased "Slipaway" was recorded as a 24-track demo by The Cars between their first and second albums. Rather than record a finished studio version, the Cars gave the song to Ian Lloyd, who issued his version later in 1979. 
"Slipaway"

Previously unreleased cover songs
The following two songs, both cover versions, were initially made as backing tracks for Bebe Buell to record vocals over for her 1981 EP Covers Girl.  These versions feature lead vocals by Ric Ocasek and Benjamin Orr, and were previously unreleased.
"The Little Black Egg"
"Funtime"

Track listing

Personnel
Elliot Easton – lead guitar, backing vocals
Greg Hawkes – keyboard, backing vocals
Ric Ocasek – rhythm guitar, lead vocals on disc one tracks: 2, 3, 4, 5, 11, 12, 13, 15, 16, 18, 19; disc two tracks: 1, 3, 4, 5, 7, 9, 11, 12, 13, 14, 15, 16, 17, 18, 19, 20
Benjamin Orr – bass guitar, lead vocals on disc one tracks: 1, 6, 7, 8, 9, 10, 14, 17, 20; disc two tracks: 2, 6, 8, 10
David Robinson – drums, percussion

Notes

References

1995 compilation albums
The Cars compilation albums
Albums produced by Robert John "Mutt" Lange
Albums produced by Roy Thomas Baker
Albums produced by Mike Shipley
Albums produced by Ric Ocasek
Elektra Records compilation albums